Phillips Hill is an unincorporated community in Sussex County, Delaware, United States. Phillips Hill is located on Delaware Route 24 and Delaware Route 30, southwest of Millsboro.

References

Unincorporated communities in Sussex County, Delaware
Unincorporated communities in Delaware